Environmental governance is a concept in environmental policy that steers markets, technology and society towards achieving the goal of sustainability. It considers social, economic and environmental aspects in the decision making of its policies.

Brazil is currently developing at an incredibly fast rate, only out-performed by countries such as China and India, both in terms of economic growth and recovery rate after the global financial crisis in the late 2000s. The saying that “Brazil is the country of the future...and it always will be” has haunted Brazil for decades. But recent economic policy changes, made since the founding of the New Republic, have allowed Brazil to start gaining international confidence. This was epitomised when American President Barack Obama stated that “The people of Brazil should know that the future has arrived” during a visit to Rio de Janeiro in March 2011. Brazil is also no longer referred to as a developing country, but as an emerging country, a newly industrialised country (NIC) and as a member of the BRIC economies. But with this fast economic growth rate comes huge responsibility in terms of sustainability. Brazil's economic growth is supported by the huge demand of natural resources from China, resources that Brazil has in abundance. Brazil is currently successfully matching the needs of China's manufacturing industry and with huge investments currently being made to sustain this demand from China, Brazil is building new ports and airports and increasing the capacity of its current ones.

However, this vast extraction of natural resources is coming at a price for the natural environment. Former Environment Minister Marina Silva resigned in 2008 as she felt the Brazilian government was prioritizing the interests of big businesses and the economy, and felt she was fighting a losing battle to protect many of Brazil's natural environments, including the Amazon Rainforest.

Despite these claims, Brazil has been praised for its environmental sustainability efforts and attempts to reduce its carbon emissions. The Brazilian government created the Ministry of the Environment (MMA) in 1985 and following this, organisations have been created, such as IBAMA in 1989, with the aim to protect the natural environment. Brazil has also taken a front seat with regards to global environmental governance by jointly creating and presiding the Megadiverse Like-Minded Countries Group, which includes 70% of the world's living biodiversity and 45% of the world's population.

National Environmental Policy 

In 1981, the Brazilian government put into force the National Environmental Policy (NEP), through Law No. 6938. The main objective of this policy is to establish standards that make sustainable development possible, using mechanisms and instruments that are capable of ensuring greater protection for the environment. The NEP covers many environmental issues, including the definition of standards, licensing, environmental impact assessments, special areas for preservation, incentives for cleaner production, and environmental zoning. The guidelines of this policy are developed through standards and plans to guide public bodies of the Brazilian federation, in accordance with the ten principles stated in Article 2 of Law 6938. These principles are as follows:

Government action in maintaining the ecological balance, considering the environment as a public asset to be necessarily guaranteed and protected, in view of collective use;
 The rational use of soil, subsoil, water and air;
 Planning and supervision of the use of environmental resources;
 Protection of ecosystems, the preservation of representative areas;
 Control and zoning of polluting or potentially polluting activities;
 Incentives to study and research technologies for the rational use and protection of environmental resources;
 Monitoring the state of environmental quality;
 Restoration of degraded areas;
 Protection of areas threatened with degradation;
Environmental education at all levels of education, including community education, intended to enable them to participate actively in environmental protection

The twelve instruments of the National Environmental Policy used to promote environment protection are presented in Article 9 of the Law, and are as follows:
 Establishment of environmental quality standards;
 Environmental zoning;
 Environmental impact assessments;
 Licensing and review of effective or potentially polluting activities;
 Incentives for production and installation of equipment and the creation or uptake of technology designed to improve environmental quality;
 The creation of special protected areas by the federal, state and municipal governments, such as environmental protection areas of significant ecological interest and extractive reserves; (Writing amended by Law No. 7804 of 18.07.89)
 The national system of environmental information;
 The Federal Technical Register of Activities and Instrument of Environmental Defense;
 Disciplinary penalties for the failure to put in place measures necessary for prevention and correction of environmental degradation.
 Establishment of the Report of Environmental Quality, to be published annually by IBAMA (Item added by Law No. 7.804 of 18.07.89)
 To ensure the provision of information relating to the environment, and ensuring the Government produces them when they are absent; (Item added by Law No. 7.804 of 18.07.89)
 The Federal Technical Registry of potentially polluting activities and/or ones that use environmental resources. (Item added by Law No. 7.804 of 18.07.89)

National Environment System 

Brazil is the world's fifth-largest country and therefore ensuring that economic development takes place in a manner that is sustainable and that does not cause environmental degradation is an enormous task. To tackle this, the NEP created the National Environment System (SISNAMA), which brings together agencies and environmental institutions of the Union, the states, the municipalities and the Federal District, and whose primary purpose is to put in place the principles and norms that are imposed by the constitution. The head of this system's structure is the National Government Council, which is the top advisory body, of the Brazilian President, for formulating the guidelines and national environmental policies. Below this comes the National Environment Council (CONAMA), which is the agency that advises the national government and deliberates over rules and standards suitable for protecting the environment, which must be followed by state and municipal governments. Following this comes the Ministry of the Environment (MMA), which plans, coordinates, supervises and controls the national environmental policy and guidelines established for the environment, performing the task of holding together the various agencies and entities that comprise the SISNAMA. Tied to the MMA is the Brazilian Institute of Environment and Renewable Natural Resources (IBAMA), which formulates, coordinates, supervises, manages, promotes and enforces the NEP and the preservation and conservation of natural resources. And finally, at the bottom of the SISNAMA structure are the local municipal and state agencies responsible for inspecting environmentally degrading activities and for implementing programs, projects and monitoring activities harmful to the environment.

Challenges

Brazil's natural environment is still suffering from the effects of the aggressive policy of demographic occupation and economic development created by a geographical strategy of regional integration, enforced during the military government from 1964 to 1985. The aim of this was to ease the population pressure in the heavily populated southeast region of Brazil, to create jobs and make use of Brazil's vast supply of natural resources. This brought many migrants to the Amazon Basin (especially in the states of Rondônia, Mato Grosso, and Pará), and the infrastructure and town expansions that came with this migration has put a lot of pressure on the Amazon Forest, which has suffered significantly from deforestation.  Reversing this problem is a difficult task as it involves removing the population which has now established itself in these environments and encouraging less investment and development to occur in these places, in order to protect the natural environment. The creation of the NEP, during the military government's rule is possibly a response to environmental NGOs’ constant pressure on not only the national government, but also on international creditors, in an effort to reduce further environmental degradation, during this period of demographic occupation.

Personal interests and economic pressures are significant barriers to successful environmental governance and removing bias from decision making is of utmost importance in order to preserve sustainability. The foundation of environmental policy making in Brazil is scientific knowledge. However, studies have suggested that, in some cases, policymakers in Brazil are inclined to use scientific evidence that supports their decisions, instead of deliberating over all the scientific knowledge available.

ISO 14000 standards
An important part of establishing Brazil's competitiveness on the world market is by being in line with the global market requirements. Many of Brazil's chemical facilities have received ISO 14000 certification and several more are close to being certified. The motivation behind this is Brazil's desire to boost its image on the international market and to increase trade with foreign partners. Brazil also participates on the technical committee of the ISO 14000 standards.

Water governance

Marine and coastal zoning
Environmental governance in Brazil tends to be carried out with a top-down approach, whereby the government puts in place legislation that markets have to abide to. This command-and-control approach has sometimes led to tensions between the governments, business and local communities. An example of this is the establishment of marine and coastal protected areas in Brazil. Restrictions are often imposed on artisanal fisheries without any involvement of the local communities in the decision making, and the negative impact on the livelihood of these local communities has resulted in several conflicts. The ecological resilience of coastal fisheries is also said to be affected by the top-down approach of creating reserves. The lack of local involvement, public participation and co-management is thought to limit ecological resilience and reduce the effectiveness of the coastal reserves in protecting wildlife numbers.

National Water Resource Policy
Brazil has a vast supply of fresh water with some of the largest river basins in the world (Amazon River, Paraná River and São Francisco River). Protecting this natural resource is not only of ecological important, but also social and economic, as many cities and populated areas of Brazil depend on them as a source of clean water. A water governance option in Brazil to manage this issue is the National Water Resource Policy (NWRP), which was established in 1997  after more than a decade of congressional discussion. The NWRP aims to promote water as a resource with economic value and “creates structures for integrated governance of all water uses at the level of the hydrographic basin – river basin councils (RBCs) – that work in tandem with more traditional management such as municipal and state water and environmental agencies”. However, it has been argued that this policy has focused excessively on top-down strategies, such as the introduction of water pricing and environmental charges, instead of addressing public mobilisation, river restoration and environmental justice.

Forest governance
Despite the predominant top-down approach of environmental governance in Brazil, there are cases where NGOs, companies, governments, and research institutions have joined together to promote ecological restoration. The Atlantic Forest Restoration Pact (AFRP) is an example of this. The AFRP aims to restore 15 million hectares of the degraded and fragmented Atlantic Forest by 2050 by promoting: biodiversity conservation, and job growth through the restoration supply chain, and establishing incentives for landowners to comply with the Forest Act. This demonstrates environmental NGOs’ use of national legislation (especially environmental zoning) in order to promote environmental protection and sustainability in Brazil.

Climate change governance
Brazil's large industrial and economic output, together with the fact that it hosts some of the world's largest natural resources make it a key player in global climate change governance. In late 2009, Carlos Minc, the Brazilian Minister of Environment, announced plans to reduce deforestation in Brazil by 80% by 2020, which corresponds to a 40% reduction in greenhouse gas emissions. Brazil has used its growing international influence to ensure developed countries fulfil their promises of transferring technologies and financing global development, with the aim of protecting the environment and promoting sustainability.

Technology

Life Cycle Engineering (LCE)

There have been suggestions of implementing LCE in order to reduce possible environmental impacts and risks to human life, while still offering economic viability and social equity. This technique uses engineering tools and concepts in order to promote greater economic sustainability. These tools include eco-design and lifecycle assessment, clean production techniques, reverse logistics, disassembly, recycling, remanufacturing, reuse and geographical information systems (GIS).

Biofuels
First-generation biofuels are made using food crops explicitly grown for fuel production (for example ethanol made from sugar cane) and are not regarded as environmentally beneficial. Advanced biofuels (2nd generation and up) however are seen as an important route to sustainable development. Brazil's Environment Minister Izabella Teixeira claims that “biofuel production in Brazil is driven by public policies that seek to increase its production in a "sustainable manner", conserving nature, creating jobs and sharing the benefits among the population”.

Sustainable biofuel production involves intense agricultural activity and therefore must be carefully planned and managed. Brazil is one of the world's leading biofuel producers and importers.  The Environment Minister also claimed that “the strategy of boosting ethanol and biodiesel production is founded on a combination of two important management tools and agricultural and environmental planning: Ecological and Economic Zoning and Agro-Ecological Zoning”. These strategies were put in place by the NEP and the case with biofuels demonstrates how the NEP instruments can be applied successfully to the economy, whilst at the same time promoting sustainability.

See also 
 Brazilian Institute of Environment and Renewable Natural Resources (IBAMA)
 Deforestation in Brazil
 Deforestation of the Amazon Rainforest
 Environment of Brazil
 Environmental issues in Brazil
 Environmentalism in Rio Grande do Sul

References

Environmental policy in Brazil
Forestry in Brazil
Forest governance